Centro Escolar University Makati is a satellite campus of the Centro Escolar University in Manila. Its campus is in Makati.

CEU Makati is the home to the CEU School of Law and Jurisprudence.

The Campus

Gil Puyat Unit 
Located in the Makati Central Business District, CEU's first Makati campus building is housed in the Philtrust Bank Building along Sen. Gil Puyat Sr. Avenue. The science course is taken here. The campus consists of air-conditioned classrooms, laboratories, a library and lecture halls equipped with audio-visual facilities, and a car park. It also houses the CEU School of Law and Jurisprudence which was established last 2009.

Legaspi Village Unit 
The Centro Escolar University Makati Legaspi Village Unit is located at Legaspi Village along Esteban-Bolaños Streets as the extension to the Gil Puyat Unit. The non-science and the Doctor of Dental Medicine  courses are located here. This building consists of air-conditioned classrooms, computer laboratories, and a library with audio-visual facilities. The new addition is the dental facility inside the building.

School of Law and Jurisprudence 
The Juris Doctor Program is offered by the Centro Escolar University at its Sen. Gil Puyat campus at the heart of Makati.

Student involvement 
University Student Council Makati
The USC is the highest-governing body in the university. It represents the students'  rights and interests. It trains students in leadership, fosters appreciation for self-government, encourages initiative and participation in the activities of the university, and promotes wholesome companionship.

CEU Singers Makati
The Centro Escolar University Singers Makati is the official resident choral group of the campus. It is part of the Centro Escolar University Singers, which also includes CEU Singers Manila and CEU Singers Malolos.

CEU Makati Peer Facilitators Group
The Peer Facilitators Group is a group of students that serves as a strong bridge between the student population and the Guidance and Counseling Section.

CEU Makati Varsity Team
The Makati Varsity Team is composed of students from different programs of the campus. The team showcases sports and athletic ability. They compete every year in the CEU Sportsfest.

Notable Makati Escolarians 
 Roxanne Corluy, BS Medical Technology - Top 10, Mutya ng Pilipinas 2011; runner-up, Miss Philippines Earth 2012
 Yuki Sakamoto, BS HRM - recording artist and main vocalist, 1:43

References 

Centro Escolar University
Graduate schools in the Philippines
Universities and colleges in Makati
Business schools in the Philippines
Liberal arts colleges in the Philippines
Dental schools in the Philippines
Nursing schools in the Philippines
Companies based in Makati
Buildings and structures in Makati
Educational institutions established in 2005
2005 establishments in the Philippines

pam:Centro Escolar University
tl:Pamantasang Centro Escolar